Guangzhou Dongfeng East Road Primary School, located in the southern Chinese city of Guangzhou (Canton), was founded in 1984.

History
1921–1927, Zhixin Private School
1928, renamed to Zhixin Girls Private High School
1943, renamed to Zhixin Girls Public High School
1953, renamed to No. 1 Girls High School of Guangzhou
1969, renamed No. 55 High School of Guangzhou
During the Cultural Revolution, Zhixin was renamed to "Red Girls School"
1978–present, Guangzhou Zhixin High School

External links
 Zhixin High School
 Zhixin Alumni Network

Educational institutions established in 1984
Yuexiu District
1984 establishments in China